Selangor, also known by its Arabic honorific Darul Ehsan, or "Abode of Sincerity", is one of the 13 Malaysian states. It is on the west coast of Peninsular Malaysia and is bordered by Perak to the north, Pahang to the east, Negeri Sembilan to the south, and the Strait of Malacca to the west. Selangor surrounds the federal territories of Kuala Lumpur and Putrajaya, both of which were previously part of it.

The state capital of Selangor is Shah Alam, and its royal capital is Klang, while Kajang is the largest city. Petaling Jaya and Subang Jaya received city status in 2006 and 2019, respectively. Selangor is one of four Malaysian states that contain more than one city with official city status; the others are Sarawak, Johor, and Penang.

The state of Selangor has the largest economy in Malaysia in terms of gross domestic product (GDP), with RM 239.968 billion (roughly $55.5 billion) in 2015, comprising 22.60% of the country's GDP. It is the most developed state in Malaysia; it has good infrastructure, such as highways and transport, and has the largest population in Malaysia. It also has a high standard of living and the lowest poverty rate in the country.

Etymology 
The origin of the name Selangor is uncertain. A common suggestion is that the name refers to the Malay word langau, a large fly or blowfly that is found in the marshes along the Selangor River (Sungai Selangor) in the state's north-west. According to local lore, a warrior who escaped from Malacca after the Portuguese conquest, took a break from his journey north and rested under a tree here. However, he was disturbed by a persistent fly, whereupon he decided to explore the area. When he found the place to his liking and chose to settle there, he named the place "satu (se) langau" meaning "a large blowfly".

In the absence of a firm etymological explanation, alternative theories abound.  One suggestion is that the name may have originated from a kind of tree found in Kuala Selangor and along Selangor River named mentangau. Another theory claims the state's name is derived from the term Salang Ur where ur means "town" or "village" in Tamil, meaning village of the Salang people. It has also been proposed that the name is derived from a combination of salang (stabbing) and jemur (dry in the sun), indicating that it was once a place where traitors were stabbed (salang) then left to roast in the sun (jemur).

History 

The most important settlement of the area in the ancient period may have been Klang. Ancient artifacts including Bronze Age axes and bronze bell dating from the 2nd century BC, and iron tools called "tulang mawas" ("ape bones") have been found in or near Klang. The Mao Kun map dating to the Ming dynasty and used by the Admiral Zheng He during his voyages of expedition between 1405 and 1433 refers to places in Selangor such as the Klang River estuary (吉令港) and perhaps a hilly area. The Malay Annals indicates that the Selangor area was under the control of the Sultanate of Malacca in the 15th century; however, Selangor at that time was not a unified domain—separate river states such as Klang and Jeram existed in the region. According to the Malay Annals, Tun Perak was appointed the chief of Klang during the reign of Muzaffar Shah. Later, the son of Mansur Shah and Hang Li Po named Paduka Sri Cina was made raja of Jeram near Langat, which may be due to the presence of Chinese miners there.

After the fall of Malacca to the Portuguese in 1511, the area came under the control of Johor Sultanate and was later governed by Sri Agar Diraja, son of the Bendahara family of Johor. In the 17th century, Johor was involved in a war against Jambi, and the Sultan of Johor engaged the help of Bugis mercenaries from Sulawesi to fight against Jambi. After Johor won in 1679, the Bugis decided to stay and started to gain power in the region. Many Bugis began to migrate and settled along the coast of Selangor such as the estuaries of Selangor and Klang rivers. Some Minangkabaus may have also settled in Selangor by the 17th century, perhaps earlier. The Bugis and the Minangkabaus from Sumatra struggled for control of Johor; Raja Kecil, backed by the Minangkabaus, invaded Selangor but were driven off by the Bugis in 1742. In order to establish a power base, the Bugis led by Raja Salehuddin founded the present hereditary Selangor Sultanate with its capital at Kuala Selangor in 1766. Selangor is unique as the only state on the Malay Peninsula that was founded by the Bugis.

In the 19th century, the economy of Selangor boomed due to the exploitation of its tin reserves; mining occurred in various parts of Selangor, for example in Ampang, that led to the growth of Kuala Lumpur. In 1854, the Sultan of Selangor granted Raja Abdullah control of Klang, passing over Raja Mahdi, the son of the chief who previously ruled Klang, which led to the Selangor Civil War fought between 1867 and 1874. The war between the Malay factions was also partly a struggle for control of the revenues from tin. Tin mining had attracted a large influx of Chinese migrant labourers, and Chinese clans allied with Selangor chiefs also joined the civil war. The conflicts between Malay and Chinese factions in Perak and Selangor, as well as concerns over piracy that affected coastal trade, led to increasing British involvement in the affairs of the Malay states.

 
In 1874, Sultan Abdul Samad of Selangor accepted a British Resident in a system that allowed the British to govern while the Sultan remained the apparent ruler. Klang was the capital of the British colonial administration for Selangor from 1875 until 1880 when it was moved to Kuala Lumpur. Under the stability imposed by the British, Selangor again prospered. In 1896, largely through the coordination of the Resident Frank Swettenham, Selangor united with Negeri Sembilan, Perak and Pahang to form the Federated Malay States, with Kuala Lumpur its capital.

The Federated Malay States evolved into the Federation of Malaya in 1948, which became independent in 1957. The federation became known as Malaysia in 1963, when its existing states federated with the other British colonies of Sarawak, North Borneo and Singapore. The city of Kuala Lumpur functioned as the national capital of Malaysia and as the state capital of Selangor. In 1974, Selangor relinquished Kuala Lumpur to the federal government. The Sultan of Selangor commemorated the city's transfer by building an archway on the borders of the new Federal Territory and Selangor; this archway is the Kota Darul Ehsan that straddles a section of the Federal Highway between Bangsar and Petaling Jaya. The state capital was moved to Shah Alam after the cession.

Putrajaya, a new city designed to be the new administrative capital of Malaysia, was built by the federal government in Selangor; Sultan Salahuddin was asked again to cede land to the federal government. Putrajaya became a federal territory in 2001.

Geography
Selangor is located on the west of Peninsular Malaysia, overlooking the Straits of Malacca. The state is level on the west and hilly to the east, the hill and mountain, surrounding the western edge of the state effectively forming a valley and a basin area for the Klang River (also known as Sungai Klang), this valley is called Klang Valley and this is where most of the population are centered. Selangor, with an area of approximately 8,000 km², extends to the west coast of Peninsular Malaysia on the north coast of Melaka. It is located at the heart of the Peninsular Malaysia on the west coast and surrounds the Federal Territory of Kuala Lumpur and Putrajaya. Selangor is bordered north by Bernam River from Perak, south by Sepang River from Negeri Sembilan, east by the Titiwangsa Mountains and Strait of Malacca on the west. Malaysia's capital, Kuala Lumpur is located in the heart of Selangor. It was once part of Selangor territory before it was ceded to the federal government to form a Federal Territory.

Selangor is divided into 9 districts namely Sabak Bernam, Kuala Selangor, Hulu Selangor, Petaling Jaya, Klang, Kuala Langat, Hulu Langat and Sepang.

Flora and Fauna

Malaysian forest can be classified as tropical rainforest. Selangor has 250,129 ha of permanent reserve forest, of which 82,890 ha are peat swamp forest and 18,998 ha formed mangrove forest along the coast. The permanent reserve forest makes up about 32 percent of the state land. Ecoforests that are situated in Selangor are Gabai Waterfall, Taman Rimba Templer, Taman Rimba Ampang, Taman Rimba Komanwel, Sungai Chongkak, Sungai Tua, Sungai Sendat, Sungai Tekala, Kanching, Gunung Nuang and Bukit Tabur.
Reserve forest in Selangor is managed and conserved by the state's forestry department, as the National Forestry Act 1984 of the federal constitution provides that forestry comes under the jurisdiction of the respective state. The Selangor's forestry department office is located at Sultan Salahuddin Abdul Aziz Shah Building in Shah Alam.

Selangor is also home to a statutory agency of the Government of Malaysia, the Forest Research Institute Malaysia (FRIM). Located in Kepong, FRIM promotes sustainable management and optimal use of forest resources in Malaysia by generating knowledge and technology through research, development and application in tropical forestry.

Selangor has a few declared protected areas (PAs) in order to safeguard biodiversity and wildlife. They are Sungai Dusun Wildlife Reserve which is first to be reserved to protect the Sumatran Rhinos, Kutu Hill Wildlife Reserve, and Bukit Sungai Puteh Hill Wildlife Reserve which is located at Kuala Lumpur and Selangor's border. The state also has an ecotourism centre, Paya Indah Wetlands, which is located in the district Kuala Langat near Dengkil. It is a sanctuary to migratory and residential birds, Nile hippos and crocodiles.

Climate

As in the rest of Malaysia, Selangor has a tropical rainforest climate (Köppen climate classification Af) bordering on a tropical monsoon climate. The climate is very much dictated by the surrounding sea and the prevailing wind system. It has high average temperature and high average rainfall.

Demographics 

Selangor is Malaysia's most populous state; it has the nation's biggest conurbation, the Klang Valley.  Selangor's geographical position in the centre of Peninsular Malaysia contributed to the state's rapid development as Malaysia's transportation and industrial hub, creating jobs and attracting migrants from other states and from other Asian countries, especially Indonesia, the Philippines, Vietnam, Myanmar, Bangladesh, India, Pakistan and China. In recent decades, an influx of immigrants, particularly from Indonesia, has also contributed to Selangor's population.

Selangor's population has increased considerably in recent decades, due mostly to the development of the Klang Valley. The population was 1,426,250 in 1980, and by 2000 it had grown to 3,941,316, and further increased to 5,482,141 in 2010. , its population was 5,874,100.

Ethnic groups

The traditional culture of Selangor's Malay majority is also influenced by those of Bugis, Minangkabau, Mandailing, Javanese, and Banjarese ancestry; most of whom are Muslims. Javanese ancestry are dominant in west coast districts such as Sabak Bernam, Kuala Selangor, Klang, Kuala Langat and Sepang. Whereas Minangkabau descent are dominant in Gombak and Hulu Selangor. Selangor's population also includes ethnic Chinese and Indian influences; those two groups form the largest minority populations. The 3,000 Mah Meri people, part of the Orang Asli—the indigenous peoples of the Peninsula—can be found on Carey Island and maintain their culture and language while adapting to the modern way of life. With its advanced state of development, Selangor has more international ties through trade, business and education than other rural states.

Religion

According to the 2020 census, the population of Selangor is 61.1% Muslim, 21.6% Buddhist, 10.3% Hindu, 4.9% Christian/Catholic, 1% of unknown affiliations, 0.5% adherent of Taoism or Chinese religion, 0.4% follower of other religions and 0.4% non-religious. All Malays are necessarily Muslims because the definition of a Malay in the Malaysian constitution requires Malays to profess the religion of Islam.

Government 

The state is a hereditary constitutional monarchy, of which the reigning Sultan since 2001 is Sultan Sharafuddin Idris Shah. Since 19 June 2018, the Menteri Besar (chief executive of the state government) is Amirudin Shari, of the People's Justice Party (PKR) a component party of Pakatan Harapan (before, Pakatan Rakyat).

Constitution 

Consisting of 19 chapters and 100 articles, the Constitution of the State of Selangor is the highest form of law in the state. It came into force on 26 February 1959 and was separated into two parts. Under the 1959 constitution, Selangor is a constitutional monarchy.

Selangor Sultanate 

The Sultan of Selangor is the constitutional Ruler of Selangor.  The role, powers, and duties of the Sultan are set forth in the 1959 constitution, which proclaims that the office of Sultan is vested with the executive power of the state, are the head of the religion of Islam in the state and the "fountain of honours and dignities" in the state. This position is hereditary and can only be held by a member of Selangor's royal family.  The current ruler is His Royal Highness Sultan Sharafuddin Idris Shah, who has held this position since 2001.

State Executive Council 

The State Executive Council, which along with the Sultan is Selangor's executive branch of government, was established by the constitution of 1959. It is composed of the Menteri Besar—who is its chairman and Selangor's head of government—and ten other members; all of whom are appointed by the Sultan of Selangor from members of the State Assembly.  The current Menteri Besar is Yang Amat Berhormat Dato' Menteri Besar Amirudin Shari.

State Assembly 

The state also has a legislative branch, called the Selangor State Assembly. It is similar to the Parliament but is limited to making laws relating to the state. Its members are elected, usually simultaneously with federal elections.  The term of each state assembly member is limited to five years. The state assembly must be dissolved before or once it expires its term for a fresh election of its members.

List of districts

List of local authorities 
There are 12 local authorities in Selangor, namely:

 Ampang Jaya Municipal Council (MPAJ)
 Hulu Selangor Municipal Council (MPHS)
 Kajang Municipal Council (MPKJ)
 Klang Municipal Council (MPK)
 Kuala Langat Municipal Council (MPKL)
 Kuala Selangor Municipal Council (MPKS)
 Petaling Jaya City Council (MBPJ)
 Sabak Bernam District Council (MDSB)
 Selayang Municipal Council (MPS)
 Sepang Municipal Council (MPSepang)
 Shah Alam City Council (MBSA)
 Subang Jaya City Council (MBSJ)

Economy 

The economy of Selangor is a progressive market economy whose core sectors are commerce and agriculture. Selangor is the richest state in Malaysia in terms of gross domestic product (GDP) per capita (PPP). On 27 August 2005, Selangor was officially declared the first developed state in Malaysia by the state government.

Commerce and industry 

Commerce, industry and services are a major contributor to the economy of Selangor, accounting for over 58% of the state's GDP. Several industrial sites produce electronic goods, chemicals and vehicles including Proton and Perodua cars. Imported vehicles from manufacturers including Toyota, Nissan, Volkswagen and BMW Motors are also assembled in the state.

Many international manufacturing companies have set up bases here. Among the industrial cities in Selangor are Subang Jaya, Shah Alam, Klang, Kajang, Rawang, Selayang, Ampang Jaya and Petaling Jaya. Port Klang plays a key role in the industrial development of Selangor because it is the busiest port in Malaysia.

The services sector is the second largest contributor to GDP, accounting for 60.1% of the state's GDP.

Agriculture 
Agriculture, a thriving sector of Selangor's economy, contributes 1.4% of the state's GDP. Significant crops grown in the state are star fruits, papayas and bananas. Selangor is not a major producer of rice; however, paddy fields exist in Kuala Selangor and Sabak Bernam. Other agricultural activities in the state include the establishment of palm oil and rubber plantation sites.

Tourism 

Tourist attractions in Selangor include the I-City in Shah Alam, a retail and commercial hub with millions of LED lights and an indoor park; the National Zoo of Malaysia (Zoo Negara) in Ampang Jaya, the largest zoo in Malaysia with more than 4,000 animals; Sepang International Circuit in Sepang, the venue for the Formula One Malaysian Grand Prix, the A1 Grand Prix and the Malaysian Motorcycle Grand Prix; the Sultan Salahuddin Abdul Aziz Shah Mosque; Wat Chetawan and Sunway Lagoon in Bandar Sunway, Malaysia's top theme park.

Other attractions in Selangor include Batu Caves in Selayang, Shah Alam Gallery and Selangor State Library in Shah Alam, the Sultan Abdul Aziz Royal Gallery, Alam Shah Palace, GM Klang Wholesale City, and Crab Island (Pulau Ketam) off Port Klang. The most popular beaches in Selangor are located at Bagan Lalang, Sepang Gold Coast, Batu Laut Beach and Morib Beach. There are also a number of pristine nature sites such as the Firefly Sanctuary, Kuala Selangor Nature Park in Kuala Selangor, Malaysia Agriculture Park Bukit Cerakah in Shah Alam, Commonwealth Forest Park and Forest Research Institute Malaysia (FRIM) in Selayang, and Ampang Recreational Forest and Kanching Recreational Forest in Ampang Jaya.

Selangor is also well known as a haven for massage and spa lovers. Since 2009 there has been an increase in businesses operating as traditional massage and reflexology parlors. While most of the businesses are genuine, some brothels masquerade as massage parlours and spas; the Royal Malaysian Police frequently raid such establishments when they receive tip-offs from the public.

Transport 
Selangor is linked to the rest of Malaysia by comprehensive air, road and rail connections. Public transport in the state is present but underused. Most of the major highways that run through the west coast of the peninsula, including the North–South Expressway, serve Selangor as well. The high-speed roads and expressways are tolled; motorists using these roads pay the tolls using stored value cards such as Touch 'n Go and SmartTAG. Cash transactions at all tolls in Malaysia were phased out between 2015 and 2017.

Kuala Lumpur International Airport (KLIA), the country's main airport, is located in Sepang District in the south of the state; it consists of the Main Terminal Building, Satellite terminal A and klia2. Selangor also has the domestic Subang Airport, which is a major hub for corporate and private aviation in south-east Asia.

Port Klang, the busiest seaport in Malaysia by sea, is located at the western tip of Selangor.

Paid bus routes in Kuala Lumpur connect Klang Sentral in Klang, Kompleks Perhentian Kajang in Kajang, One Utama Bus Transportation Hub in Petaling Jaya, and Terminal Seksyen 13 in Shah Alam to other states in Malaysia. Public bus services that connects towns in Selangor are also available such as Rapid Bus. Rapid Bus, operated by Rapid KL, offered services in Klang Valley area, namely Subang Jaya, USJ, Puchong, Petaling Jaya, Shah Alam, and Klang south of the Federal Highway and Area Six, which covers Damansara, Bandar Utama, Kota Damansara and areas of Petaling Jaya, Shah Alam, and Klang north of the Federal Highway. The services was introduced on 23 September 2006 when Rapid KL decided to revamp the Klang Valley bus network. Other bus operators in Selangor includes  Wawasan Sutera Travel & Tours Sdn Bhd (Klang and Banting), MARA Liner Sdn Bhd (Rawang and Hulu Selangor), Handal Ceria Sdn Bhd (Puchong, Klang south and Sepang) and The Selangor Omnibus Company Berhad (Damansara Damai and Kuala Selangor).

Starting from 15 July 2015, free public bus services named Bas Smart Selangor are also available all over Selangor. It was initiate to encourage the citizens to use public transport. On 7 November 2017, a phone application called Selangor Intelligent Transport System to check Smart Selangor buses routes and schedules was launched.

The KTM Komuter railway network serves many outlying districts and nearby towns and cities, including Kajang, Port Klang, Shah Alam, Subang Jaya, Petaling Jaya, and Rawang. It is linked to other rail transit services at KL Sentral Station, a modern transportation hub in the city centre. Selangor is accessible by the Rapid KL Light Rail Transit network, which is composed of the Ampang Line, the Kelana Jaya Line and the newly completed Sungai Buloh-Kajang Mass Rapid Transit Network.

MRT network 
Kajang Line
It is a part of Greater KL/Klang Valley Integrated Transit System. The line is numbered   and coloured Green on official transit maps.
The first MRT line covers a span of 51 kilometres from Sungai Buloh to the Kajang, passing the Kuala Lumpur city centre where the alignment goes underground. The line will be serving a corridor with 1.2 million residents within the Klang Valley region from north-west to the south-east of Kuala Lumpur. The line starts from Sungai Buloh which is located to the north-west of Kuala Lumpur, which runs on an elevated guideway to the Semantan portal, passing through Kota Damansara, Bandar Utama, Seksyen 17 and Damansara Town Centre. Kwasa Damansara provides a cross-platform interchange between the SBK line and Sungai Buloh–Serdang–Putrajaya line (SSP line). The line continues in twin-bore tunnels to the Maluri portal, passing through the city centre and the Golden Triangle of Kuala Lumpur. Interchange to other lines is provided from Muzium Negara to Maluri with the exception of Cochrane in the Kuala Lumpur city. Beyond Taman Pertama, the line passes through Cheras and ends in Kajang via an elevated guideway. The line serves a corridor with an estimated population of 1.2 million people

Putrajaya Line
The MRT Putrajaya line previously known as MRT Sungai Buloh-Serdang-Putrajaya line (MRT SSP) is the twelfth rail transit line, the fourth fully automated and driverless rail system in Klang Valley area. It is a part of the larger rail transport system in Kuala Lumpur known as Greater KL/Klang Valley Integrated Transit System. The line is numbered 12 and coloured gold on transit maps.

It is one of three planned MRT rail lines under Klang Valley Mass Rapid Transit Project by MRT Corp. Phase 1 between Kwasa Damansara and Kampung Batu was operational on June 16, 2022. The remaining line is expected to be operational in 2023.

The approved rail alignment is 52.2 km in length, of which 13.5 km is underground. A total of 37 stations, 11 of which are underground, will be built. The line will stretch from Sungai Buloh to Putrajaya and will include densely populated areas Sri Damansara, Kepong, Batu, Jalan Sultan Azlan Shah, Jalan Tun Razak, KLCC, Tun Razak Exchange, Kuchai Lama, Seri Kembangan, and Cyberjaya. It is expected to have a ridership of 533,000 passengers per day once completed

Extensions to the LRT network 
On 29 August 2006, Malaysian Deputy Prime Minister Mohd Najib Abdul Razak announced that the western end of the Kelana Jaya Line would be extended to the suburbs of Bandar Sunway, Subang Jaya, UEP Subang Jaya (USJ) and Putra Heights. The extension will be part of a RM7 billion plan to expand Kuala Lumpur's public transport network.

The expansion plan will also extend the Ampang Line to the suburb of Puchong and the south-west of Kuala Lumpur. The plan also involves the construction of a new line, tentatively called the Kota Damansara-Cheras Line, which will run from Sungai Buloh in the north-western flank of the city, to Kajang.

In September 2009, Syarikat Prasarana Negara began a public viewing of the details of the alignment of the Ampang Line and Kelana Jaya Line at various locations. The public could provide feedback on the route during the three-month display period. The new terminus will be at Putra Heights where the line will meet the Kelana Jaya Line and Ampang Line to provide a suburban interchange. Construction began in mid 2013 and the project was fully operational by July 2016.

Education 

Selangor has several tertiary education institutions, most of which are concentrated in major towns and cities.

Public universities

Private universities and university colleges

International universities campus in Selangor

Infrastructures and utilities

Electricity 

There are five main power stations in Selangor, namely; Sultan Salahuddin Abdul Aziz Shah Power Station, Connaught Bridge Power Station, Putrajaya Power Station, Kuala Langat Power Plant and Jimah Energy Ventures.

Water supply 
Selangor water works provides water supply in Selangor, Kuala Lumpur and Putrajaya. It was run by Syarikat Bekalan Air Selangor (SYABAS) which is owned by the state government. There are seven dams in Selangor; Sungai Selangor Dam, Sungai Tinggi Dam, Sungai Semenyih Dam, Sungai Langat Dam, Klang Gates Dam, Sungai Batu Dam, ORS Sungai Labu Dam and Tasik Subang Dam.

Shopping malls 

Notable shopping malls in Selangor include:

 i-City
 IDCC Convention Centre
 Plaza Alam Sentral
 1 Utama
 Sunway Pyramid
 The Curve
 AEON Bukit Tinggi
 The Mines
 IPC Shopping Centre
 IOI Mall Puchong
 Subang Parade
 Empire Subang
 Klang Parade
 IOI City Mall

Hospitals 

Notable public and private hospitals in Selangor include:

Public hospitals 

 Kajang Hospital
 Serdang Hospital
 Sungai Buloh Hospital
 Tengku Ampuan Rahimah Hospital, Klang

Private hospitals 

 Assunta Hospital
 Sunway Medical Centre
 Columbia Asia Hospital

Cuisine 
The traditional Malay cuisine in Selangor has influences from Johor, Bugis, Javanese and Minangkabau.

Rojak Klang and Lontong Klang are famous cuisines in Klang and Shah Alam. Other famous dishes include Mee Rebus, Satay Kajang, Nasi Ambeng, Laksa Selangor, Soto (Soto Nasi Himpit and Mee Soto), Sambal Tahun, Bakso, Ketam Darul Ehsan, Mentarang Bakar, Ikan Masak Asam Pedas, Ayam Masak Kicap and Sayur Masak Rebung.

Media

Television 
Television in Selangor consists of seven free-to-air stations, one satellite television network and two internet television services. Three of the seven free-to-air stations are managed by Radio Televisyen Malaysia, a federal government-owned media company headquartered in Kuala Lumpur, while the four commercial stations are owned by Media Prima, an integrated media company headquartered in Bandar Utama, Selangor. The satellite television service is owned by Astro All Asia Networks and it is available nationwide. One of the Internet television services is owned by the state government of Selangor.

Radio 
Radio stations in Selangor are available in the FM and shortwave frequencies and are transmitted from Gunung Ulu Kali, Selangor and Kajang, Selangor.

There are a few types of radio stations operating in Selangor, namely, commercial radio stations, local community radio stations, federal government-owned radio stations, and specialized radio stations. Commercial radio stations available in Selangor are operated by media companies such as Astro Radio, Star Media Radio Group, Media Prima, Suara Johor and BFM Media. Local community radio stations are only available in certain regions. For example, UFM (93.6) operated by Universiti Teknologi MARA is only available in Shah Alam, Klang, and Petaling Jaya, while Putra FM (90.7) operated by Universiti Putra Malaysia is only available in Serdang and Seri Kembangan. Both radio stations target university students.

The nine Radio Televisyen Malaysia (RTM) radio networks available are Klasik FM, Muzik FM, Ai FM, Traxx FM, Minnal FM, Asyik FM, Selangor FM, KLFM, and Pahang FM. There are three specialised radio stations as well, namely IKIM.fm (91.5) operated by IKIM, Salam FM (102.5) operated by JAKIM, and Bernama Radio (93.9) operated by BERNAMA. The regions of Selangor that border other states can also receive two other Radio Televisyen Malaysia (RTM) radio stations; Perak FM (89.6 MHz/95.6 MHz; Selangor-Perak border) and Negeri FM (92.6 MHz; Selangor-Negeri Sembilan border).

Full list of radio stations available in Selangor:

Newspapers 

Mainstream newspapers in Selangor are:

 Berita Harian (in Bahasa Malaysia)
 Utusan Malaysia (in Bahasa Malaysia)
 Kosmo! (in Bahasa Malaysia)
 Harian Metro (in Bahasa Malaysia)
 Sinar Harian (in Bahasa Malaysia)
 Selangor Kini (in Bahasa Malaysia)
 New Straits Times (in English)
 The Star (in English)
 The Malay Mail (in English)
 The Sun (in English)
 Nanyang Siang Pau (in Mandarin)
 Sin Chew Daily (in Mandarin)
 China Press (in Mandarin)
 Malaysia Nanban (in Tamil)
 Tamil Nesan (in Tamil)
 Makkal Osai (in Tamil)
 Harakah (in Bahasa Malaysia and English). This newspaper is owned by the Pan-Malaysian Islamic Party
 Suara Keadilan. This newspaper is owned by People's Justice Party, a major party in the Pakatan Harapan ruling coalition.

Notable people

Image gallery

See also

 Selangor Sign Language

References

External links 

 
 Rail map of Klang Valley
 Geographical maps of Selangor
 History of Selangor
 Official Website of Online Shopping & Great Deals in Selangor, Malaysia - Everydayonsales
 Malaysia No 1 Warehouse Sale, Promotions & Bargain Deals Website - ShoppingNSales
 Tourism Selangor Official Website
 Invest Selangor Berhad Official Website
 Visit Selangor

 
States of Malaysia
Peninsular Malaysia
Strait of Malacca